Hontiveros is a surname. Notable people with the surname include:

Dondon Hontiveros (born 1977), Filipino basketball player
Eduardo Hontiveros (1923–2008), Filipino Jesuit composer and musician
Risa Hontiveros (born 1966), Filipino politician
Rodolfo Hontiveros Gabriel II, Filipino drag queen
Pia Hontiveros (born 1967), Filipino news anchor/broadcast journalist.